Sakthivel  is a 1994 Indian Tamil-language drama film directed by K. S. Ravikumar. The film stars Selva, Kanaka and Vijayakumar. Produced by M. Saravanan and M. Balasubramanian of AVM Productions, it was released on 14 April 1994 coinciding with Tamil New Year.

Plot 

Sakthivel is an honest head constable and has a daughter, Lalli. One day, he beats a politician's son. He is subsequently promoted as a Sub-inspector but he is transferred to a ruthless village. A feud between Pannaiyar and Chairman divides the village in half and every day many villagers die.

Cast 

Selva as Vignesh
Kanaka as Lalli
Vijayakumar as Sakthivel
Jai Ganesh as Pannaiyar
Rajeev as Chairman
Manjula Vijayakumar as Lakshmi, Sakthivel's wife
K. S. Ravikumar as Sangili Murugan
Premi as Pannaiyar's wife
Sabitha Anand as Chairman's wife
Y. G. Mahendra
Charle
Vasu Vikram
Kumarimuthu
Vimalraj
Bayilvan Ranganathan
Idichapuli Selvaraj
Pandu
Ashok Raja
Chitraguptan as Kandha
Purushothaman as Poosari
Dakshayini

Soundtrack 
The soundtrack was composed by Ilaiyaraaja.

Reception 
Malini Mannath of The Indian Express wrote, "Ravikumar has woven a tale that may not be all exciting but is nevertheless neatly told." K. Vijiyan of New Sunday Times gave a positive review that film had good elements "a good story, meaningful dialogue, humour, good acting and drama".

References

External links 

 

1990s Tamil-language films
1994 drama films
1994 films
AVM Productions films
Films directed by K. S. Ravikumar
Films scored by Ilaiyaraaja
Indian drama films